Englewood is a city in Clark County, Kansas, United States.  As of the 2020 census, the population of the city was 58.

History
Englewood was founded in 1884. It was named after the city of Englewood, Illinois. The first post office in Englewood was established in 1885.

Geography

Demographics

2010 census
As of the census of 2010, there were 77 people, 40 households, and 20 families residing in the city. The racial makeup of the city was 88.3% White, 1.3% Asian, and 10.4% from other races. Hispanic or Latino of any race were 10.4% of the population.

There were 40 households, of which 15.0% had children under the age of 18 living with them, 45.0% were married couples living together, 2.5% had a female householder with no husband present, 2.5% had a male householder with no wife present, and 50.0% were non-families. 45.0% of all households were made up of individuals, and 22.5% had someone living alone who was 65 years of age or older. The average household size was 1.93 and the average family size was 2.75.

The median age in the city was 53.5 years. 19.5% of residents were under the age of 18; 0.0% were between the ages of 18 and 24; 11.7% were from 25 to 44; 36.4% were from 45 to 64; and 32.5% were 65 years of age or older. The gender makeup of the city was 59.7% male and 40.3% female.

2000 census
As of the census of 2000, there were 109 people, 49 households, and 29 families residing in the city. The racial makeup of the city was 94.50% White, 0.92% Native American, 4.59% from other races. Hispanic or Latino of any race were 6.42% of the population.

There were 49 households, out of which 24.5% had children under the age of 18 living with them, 55.1% were married couples living together, 4.1% had a female householder with no husband present, and 38.8% were non-families. 34.7% of all households were made up of individuals, and 18.4% had someone living alone who was 65 years of age or older. The average household size was 2.22 and the average family size was 2.90.

In the city, the population was spread out, with 19.3% under the age of 18, 4.6% from 18 to 24, 18.3% from 25 to 44, 30.3% from 45 to 64, and 27.5% who were 65 years of age or older. The median age was 50 years. For every 100 females, there were 131.9 males. For every 100 females age 18 and over, there were 131.6 males.

The median income for a household in the city was $22,500, and the median income for a family was $28,750. Males had a median income of $23,750 versus $0 for females. The per capita income for the city was $10,744. There were 13.3% of families and 30.3% of the population living below the poverty line, including 66.7% of under eighteens and 6.5% of those over 64.

Education
The community is served by Ashland USD 220 public school district.

Englewood High School was closed through school unification. The Englewood High School mascot was Bulldogs.

References

Further reading

External links

 Englewood - Directory of Public Officials
 Englewood City Map, KDOT

Cities in Kansas
Cities in Clark County, Kansas